North Fork Tomlinson Run is a  long 2nd order tributary to Tomlinson Run in Hancock County, West Virginia.  This stream along with South Fork Tomlinson Run, forms Tomlinson Run in Tomlinson Run Lake.

Course
North Fork Tomlinson Run rises about 4 miles southeast of Chester, West Virginia, in Hancock County and then flows southwest to form Tomlinson Run at Tomlinson Run State Park.

Watershed
North Fork Tomlinson Run drains  of area, receives about 38.1 in/year of precipitation, has a wetness index of 316.01, and is about 61% forested.

See also
List of rivers of West Virginia

References

Rivers of Hancock County, West Virginia
Rivers of West Virginia